BTFC can refer to one of the following English football clubs:

 Barnoldswick Town F.C.
 Basingstoke Town F.C.
 Beckenham Town F.C.
 Bedford Town F.C.
 Bedlington Terriers F.C.
 Belper Town F.C.
 Berkhamsted Town F.C.
 Bicester Town F.C.
 Billericay Town F.C.
 Billingham Town F.C.
 Boston Town F.C.
 Bourne Town F.C.
 Brackley Town F.C.
 Bracknell Town F.C.
 Brading Town F.C.
 Braintree Town F.C.
 Brentwood Town F.C.
 Bridgnorth Town F.C.
 Bridlington Town F.C.
 Brigg Town F.C.
 Buckingham Town F.C.
 Bury Town F.C.

See also
Bridlington Town A.F.C.